Laura Nicoletta Vasilescu (born 03 November 1984) is a Romanian female handballer who plays for HSG Bad Wildungen in Bundesliga.

She was the best scorer of the 2014-15 Bundesliga season, with 230 goals in 26 games.

Personal life
In September 2019, Vasilescu announced that she came out as lesbian.

Individual awards
 Bundesliga Top Scorer: 2015

References

1984 births
Living people
People from Buzău
Romanian female handball players
Romanian expatriate sportspeople in Greece
Romanian expatriate sportspeople in Germany
Lesbian sportswomen
LGBT handball players
Romanian lesbians
Romanian LGBT sportspeople